Amalgamated Investment and Property Co Ltd v John Walker & Sons Ltd [1977] 1 WLR 164 is an English contract law case, concerning common mistake and the frustration of an agreement.

Facts
John Walker Ltd sold to Amalgamated Investment Co Ltd a bonded warehouse and bottling factory for £1,710,000 for occupation or redevelopment. Amalgamated asked whether the building was designated historic or of architectural interest. John Walker said it was not historic. Unfortunately, on 22 August 1973 the Department of Environment listed the property. The contract was signed on 25 September 1973. Then the Secretary of State wrote to John Walker that it had been listed, taking effect on that day. The property value dropped to £200,000 (because a listed property which one cannot easily develop is often worth less money). Amalgamated asked for the contract to be set aside for common mistake, or for frustration, depending on whether the listing took effect before or after 25 September.

Judgment
The Court of Appeal said the listing took effect on 27 September, when the Secretary signed the listing papers. However the contract was not frustrated. It held that Amalgamated had taken on the risk that the building could be listed. This was shown by the nature of their pre-contractual enquiries. So the listing did not make the contract something radically different from that contemplated by the parties.

See also
English contract law
Frustration in English law

References

R Brownsword, 'Rules and Principles at the Warehouse' (1977) 40(4) Modern Law Review 467-471

English contract case law
Court of Appeal (England and Wales) cases
1977 in case law
1977 in British law